The Melilla border fence forms part of the Morocco–Spain border in the city of Melilla, one of two Spanish cities in north Africa. Constructed by Spain, its stated purpose is to stop illegal immigration and smuggling. Melilla's border and its equivalent in Ceuta, also bordering Morocco, are the only two land borders between the European Union and an African country.

Recent history
In September 2005, some thousands of sub-Saharan African migrants tried to climb over the fences in several waves moving upon Melilla. About 700 made it past the fences while six died in clashes with Moroccan security forces. The 2005 events at the Melilla and Ceuta border fences are the subject of a documentary film, Victimes de nos richesses.

Three hundred people attempted and 30 succeeded in climbing the fence in August 2020, some of the 2,250 people who entered Ceuta and Melilla in 2020. Eighty-seven people scaled the fence on January 19, 2021; nine were taken to hospital. 2000 people scaled the fence on 25 June 2022; 133 successfully. Eighteen people died and several were taken to the hospital.

Renovation
Anti-immigration sentiment toward African migrants prompted the Spanish government of José Luis Rodríguez Zapatero in 2005 to build up a new border fence. This border fence, built next to the two deteriorated existing ones, completely seals the border. In 2018, the new interior minister of Spain recognized the anti-immigration sentiment that the fence stems from and has vowed to replace the razor wire that runs along its top with more humane deterrents.  "Spain's new interior minister has vowed to do "everything possible" to remove the "anti-migrant" razor wire fences, which separate Morocco from the Spanish territories of Ceuta and Melilla."  

This third razor wire barrier cost Spain €33 million to construct. Underground cables connect spotlights, noise and movement sensors, and video cameras to a central control booth. In 2005 its height was doubled to  since immigrants were climbing the previous fences equipped with home-made steps. Also, in order to facilitate the intruders' detention, devices to slow them harmlessly were added.

Even with three fences built, people still scale them and arrive on Spanish territory. From these, Amnesty International and Médecins Sans Frontières accused the Moroccan government of dumping people from various African countries (some of them claiming to be validly registered as political refugees) in an uninhabited area of the Sahara Desert without food or water supplies.

See also 
 Ceuta border fence
 Moroccan Wall
 Spanish Armed Forces: General Command of Melilla

References

External links 

    2008-Oct-27: 50 persons enter Melilla after storm breaks the Fence

 Attacking The New Border Wars
 Melilla border fence photo gallery: 1 2  6 7 8  9 10 11 12

Border barriers
Morocco–Spain border
Buildings and structures in Melilla
European migrant crisis
21st century in Melilla
2005 in Spain
2005 in Morocco
2005 disasters in Morocco